Krasnoye is a rural locality (a village) in Trubchevsky District, Bryansk Oblast, Russia. The population was 737 as of 2010. There are 15 streets.

Geography 
Krasnoye is located 5 km southwest of Trubchevsk (the district's administrative centre) by road. Makarzno is the nearest rural locality.

References 

Rural localities in Trubchevsky District